Cowaramup Bombora (also known as Cowie Bombie or simply Cow Bombie) is a big wave open-ocean surf break found on the south-west coast of Western Australia. 

 
Its name comes from Cowaramup, the name of the small local townsite, and bombora, an Indigenous Australian term for an area of large sea waves breaking over a shallow area.

The break was featured in the 2013 documentary series Storm Surfers 3D which described it as "on its day, the tallest wave in Australia", where Tom Carroll survived a near-death wipeout while surfing with Ross Clarke-Jones. It also featured in the 2011 documentary film Fighting Fear.
 
In 2011, Western Australian surfer Damien Warr won the Oakley Biggest Wave award for his ride on Cow Bombie. In February 2015, Jarryd Foster, won the Oakley Biggest Wave award for his ride on Cow Bombie. Mick Corbett was also a 2015 finalist for the same award with his Cow Bombie ride.

On 26 June 2015, Australian surfer Felicity Palmateer became the first woman to surf Cow Bombie.

On 2 March 2016, the Oakley Big Wave Awards 2015-2016 were announced, with two of the three major awards coming from Cow Bombie: Zac Haynes won Biggest Paddle-In, and Justin Holland won Biggest Wave in Australian Waters, finishing 2nd and 3rd respectively for Ride Of The Year. All three contenders for Biggest Wave were at Cow Bombie.

References

Coastal and oceanic landforms
Surfing locations in South West Western Australia